Þórðarson is a surname of Icelandic origin, meaning son of Þórður. In Icelandic names, the name is not strictly a surname, but a patronymic. The name is sometimes written Thordarson and may refer to:

Björn Þórðarson (1879–1963), Icelandic politician; Prime Minister of Iceland 1942–44
Chester Thordarson (born Hjörtur Þórðarson) (1867–1945), inventor who held nearly a hundred patents
Fridrik Thordarson (1928-2005), Icelandic linguist
Guðjón Þórðarson (born 1955), Icelandic professional football manager
Guðlaugur Þór Þórðarson (born 1967), Icelandic politician; member of the Althing since 2003
Óláfr Þórðarson (1210–1259), Icelandic scholar and skald
Ólafur Þórðarson (footballer) (born 1965), Icelandic professional football player
Sigurdur Thordarson (born 1992), FBI informant against Julian Assange
Sigurjón Þórðarson (born 1964), Icelandic politician
Sigvatr Þórðarson (fl. 11th century), court poet to kings of Norway 
Stefán Þórðarson (born 1975), Icelandic professional football player
Sturla Þórðarson (1214–1284), Icelandic chieftain and writer of sagas
Teitur Thordarson (born 1952), Icelandic football coach
Þórbergur Þórðarson (1889–1974), Icelandic author and Esperantist

Surnames
Icelandic-language surnames